The 2015 PEI Tankard, the provincial men's curling championship of Prince Edward Island, was held from February 6 to 10 at the Western Community Curling Club in Alberton, Prince Edward Island. The winning Adam Casey team represented Prince Edward Island at the 2015 Tim Hortons Brier in Calgary.

Teams
The teams are listed as follows:

Knockout Draw Brackets

A event

B event

C event

Knockout results

Draw 1
Friday, February 6, 2:00 pm

Draw 2
Friday, February 6, 6:30 pm

Draw 2
Saturday, February 7, 10:00 am

Draw 4
Saturday, February 7, 3:30 pm

Draw 5
Sunday, February 8, 11:00 am

Draw 6
Sunday, February 8, 3:30 pm

Draw 7
Monday, February 9, 11:00 am

Draw 8
Monday, February 9, 3:30 pm

Playoffs
The playoffs round involves the teams that won the three qualifying matches. Since Casey won two of the three matches and was in all three matches, Casey received berths in both the semifinal and the final. Newson will need to defeat Casey twice in order to claim the championship, while if Casey wins either playoff game, he will claim the championship.

Semifinal
Tuesday, February 10, 11:00 am

Final
Not required.

References

2015 Tim Hortons Brier
Curling competitions in Prince Edward Island
Prince County, Prince Edward Island
February 2015 sports events in Canada
2015 in Prince Edward Island